Gălăteni is a commune in Teleorman County, Muntenia, Romania. It is composed of three villages: Bâscoveni, Gălăteni and Grădișteanca.

References

Communes in Teleorman County
Localities in Muntenia